Palugunti palli is a village in Racherla mandal, in the Prakasam district in the state of Andhra Pradesh in India.

Villages in Prakasam district